The 1985 La Flèche Wallonne was the 49th edition of La Flèche Wallonne cycle race and was held on 17 April 1985. The race started and finished in Huy. The race was won by Claude Criquielion of the Hitachi team.

General classification

References

1985 in road cycling
1985
1985 in Belgian sport
1985 Super Prestige Pernod International